Urban Street Jam is an annual hip-hop culture festival that showcases music, art, dance, and fashion in the hip-hop community.

History 
Craig Borja of Phaze1 Entertainment/owner and producer along with Marlon Shell of Stylz Dance Studio/Co owner and producer of Urban Street Jams first annual event was held on February 20, 2010, Urban Street Jam's original venue was scheduled to be outdoors at Verizon Wireless Amphitheatre (Irvine) at the Hidden Valley Park, but due to weather, the venue was changed last minute to Hilton Hotel in Costa Mesa, California. Urban Street Jam had a fashion show, choreography dance competition, 2 vs 2 all stylz dance battle, bboy dance competition, clothing venues, viewers choice battle, graffiti showcase and import show cars. Also, Stephen "Twitch" Boss from So You Think You Can Dance taught a dance workshop at the event.

Hosts 

The entire festival was hosted by Stylz Dance Studio in Covina, California and Phaze1 Entertainment.
Emcees include 21XL Production's Myron Marten and Sick Step Dance Crew's Mookie, who have both hosted Vibe Dance Competition.
Sponsors include Power 106, World of Dance, and Hip Hop International, BOOGIEZONE.COM, Kallusive Clothing, DanceTag.tv, and Clubbing411.

Performers 
Several celebrities in the dance community have performed for this event including those from America's Best Dance Crew and So You Think You Can Dance. Dancers include Stephen "Twitch" Boss, Dominic "D-Trix" Sandoval of Quest Crew, Hokuto "Hok" Konishi of Quest Crew, RJ KoolRaul of Supreme Soul, Smart Mark and Lil-O of Phresh Select, Kaba Modern Legacy, Mike Song and Victor Kim of Quest Crew.

Winners 
2010

Choreography Dance Competition 
1st: Common Ground from Irvine, California
2nd: 220 from San Diego, California
3rd: Main Ingredient from Los Angeles, California

All Stylz Dance Battle 
 Mike Song of Kaba Modern and Victor Kim of Quest Crew
 D-Trix of Quest Crew and Hok of Quest Crew
 Smart Mark of Phresh Select/AOP and Lil-O of Phresh Select/AOP

2011

Choreography Dance Competition 
1st: Choreo Cookies from Oceanside, California
2nd: Academy of Villains Northern California
3rd: Jungle Boogie from  Atlanta, Georgia

All Stylz Battle Dance Battle 

1st: Miss Funk, Breeze Lee, & Full-Out of VersaStyle Dance Company

See also

List of hip hop music festivals
Hip hop culture

References

External links 
 Urban Street Jam official website
  Stylz Dance Studio Host of the festival

Hip hop music festivals in the United States
Street dance competitions
Music festivals established in 2011
Music festivals in California